François Hubert Prume (3 June 1816, Stavelot – 14 July 1849, Liège) was a Belgian violinist and composer.

Prume was Professor of Violin at the Royal Conservatory of Liège at the age of seventeen years, where his pupils included Hubert Léonard, and his own nephew, Frantz Jehin-Prume.  His many concert tours brought him to capitals throughout Europe, during which he performed occasionally with Franz Liszt.

He received the honorary title of "Virtuoso of the Duke of Gotha".  However, his career ended prematurely with his death from cholera at the age of 33.  He was buried in Liège at the Cimetière de Robermont.  The great hall of the former Abbey of Stavelot in his hometown was named in his memory.

Major works
Concertino for Violin and Orchestra, op. 4 
Le Petit Savoyard for Violin and Orchestra

External links
 

1816 births
1849 deaths
People from Stavelot
Deaths from cholera
Belgian classical violinists
Belgian classical composers
Belgian male classical composers
Romantic composers
Infectious disease deaths in Belgium
Academic staff of the Royal Conservatory of Liège
19th-century classical composers
19th-century classical violinists
Male classical violinists
19th-century Belgian male musicians